Nalli is one of the village of India.Sattur taluk,Virudhunagar district,Tamilnadu state.

It is located 18 km from  sattur - Kovilpatti National Highway and 1.6 km from left.

It has population of approximate 2000. It has famous temple Singamadai Ayyanar Kovil located at Nalli reservoir(kanmai). The festival of Masi Maha Shivaratri attracts many devotees from Tamil Nadu.

Nalli Muppidathi Amman Kovil- Purattasi pongal 15 days festival is very well celebrating by local people.

Temples.

Kaalasamy kovil, Malkammal Kovil, Pathinettampadi Karuppasamy Temple, Pavalayi Amman Temple,Sekkadi SelvaVinayagar Kovil,  Subbuthayammal Kovil,Kanni kuruvuthai amman temple,Sundara vinayagar temple,Somasundara vinayagar temple, Kasi viswanathar temple,Muniyasamy Temple and more temples are here.

Many occupations in the village are Agriculture and Textiles.

Education

It has one panchayat primary school and one Government Higher Secondary School with Govt Hostel(Adhithiravida nala thurai).
Higher studies students are going to kovilpatti and stature surrounding colleges.

It also has few operational branches of Bank of India,
Post Office of India(Branch post office)
Co-operate Bank.

Now have a good maintenance primary health center.it helps to Nalli and nearby villages.

Transport Facilities

Nearby Railway station Kovilpatti 7km

Nearby Airport Madurai 80km

A small railway station named Nalli from here 5 km but no services for passengers,only trains crossings.

Bus transport

Two private buses are servicing Nalli for connect to sattur and kovilpatti.

Malaiyamman bus

8.25 am sattur(from kovilpatti 8.05 am)

11.30 am kovilpatti(from sattur 11 am)

6.25 pm sattur(from kovilpatti 6.05pm)

7.25 pm kovilpatti(from sattur 7 pm)

SSK bus

8.35 am kovilpatti (from sattur8.05am)

12.05 pm sattur(from kovilpatti11.45pm)

5.35 kovilpatti(from sattur 5.05pm)

9.40 kovilpatti(from kovilpatti 9.15pm)

TNSTC Madurai bus

6.35 am kovilpatti(from sattur 6.05am)

1.35 pm kovilpatti(from kovilpatti 1.05pm)

8.35 pm sattur(from kovilpatti 8.10pm).

References

Villages in Virudhunagar district